Carl Barks (1901–2000) was an American Disney Studio illustrator and Disney comic book creator. The quality of his scripts and drawings earned him the nicknames The Duck Man and The Good Duck Artist.

This list of Carl Barks' Disney stories is incomplete as it does not contain covers and unpublished comics, and some titles, writers and exact dates in the list are unknown.

Barks' non-Disney comic book stories are listed in List of non-Disney comics by Carl Barks.

List of comic book stories
Source:

Comic strips

See also
 List of non-Disney comics by Carl Barks / Carl Barks
 List of Disney comics by Don Rosa / Don Rosa
 Donald Duck in comics / Donald Duck universe
 Disney comics / Inducks (Disney comics database)

References

Disney comics stories
 
Comics by Carl Barks
Barks, Carl
Disney